Scary Endings is a horror anthology series currently airing on the YouTube channel WhereIsTheRockHammer.

Each episode is directed by John Fitzpatrick, director of Skypemare and Brentwood Strangler. The series is produced by Brian Chandler, Jessica Chandler, Ryan Dillon, John Fitzpatrick, Sarah Fitzpatrick, and Adam J. Yeend. Being an anthology series, each episode features a new cast with different characters and a stand-alone story in the vein of Tales from the Crypt. The series is currently in its second season and has garnered a strong online fan following and critical acclaim within the horror community, having also screened at several horror film festivals and receiving continued coverage from multiple horror media outlets, including Blumhouse.com, Dread Central, and HorrorBuzz. The series is filmed in Los Angeles, California.

Production
The series is self-financed by six producers Brian Chandler, Jessica Chandler, Ryan Dillon, John Fitzpatrick, Sarah Fitzpatrick, and Adam J. Yeend, with each episode estimated to cost under $1000. Each episode is directed by John Fitzpatrick with Nicholas Kaat as cinematographer. Writing credits have been shared around between the producers.

Episodes
Episodes are uploaded roughly one month apart. Season one consists of 10 episodes and season two has aired five. "Welcome to the Circus" is the series' most viewed episode followed by "The Grinning Man". The fourth episode of the first season, "Yummy Meat: A Halloween Carol", is the only episode to be written by a writer outside of the producing team; it premiered at the 2015 Screamfest Horror Film Festival. Two episodes, "The Grinning Man" and "Am I Beautiful?", are based on known urban legends. The season-two episode "The Water Rises", which deals with a couple trapped in a sinking elevator on a cruise ship, received the most online coverage and is considered the most ambitious episode on a technical level; it was also praised for its emotional intensity.

References

External links

2010s American anthology television series
American drama web series
Horror fiction web series